The 2018 season was the 109th season in the history of Sport Club Corinthians Paulista.

Background

Kits
 Home (May 2018 onward): White shirt, black shorts and white socks;
 Away (May 2018 onward): Black shirt, white shorts and black socks;
 Third (October 2018 onward): Black and gold shirt, black shorts and black socks.

Previous Kits
 Home (Until April 2018): White shirt, black shorts and white socks.
 Away (Until April 2018): Black shirt, white shorts and black socks.
 Third (Until September 2018): Dark grey shirt, dark grey shorts and dark grey socks.

Squad
As of 22 August 2018

 (on loan from Hannover 96)

(on loan from Universidad de Chile)
 (on loan from Nacional-SP)

(on loan from Real Madrid)

 (on loan from Torino)

Managerial changes
On May 22, Fábio Carille accepted an offer from Saudi club Al-Wehda to become their manager. Assistant manager Osmar Loss then assumed as the new manager.

On September 5, Loss was dismissed after losing an away match against Ceará. It was announced that he would remain in the technical staff as an assistant coach. The next day, Jair Ventura was announced as the new manager.

Transfers

Transfers in

Loans in

Transfers out

Loans out

Squad statistics

Overview

Pre-season and friendlies

Florida Cup

Friendlies

Last updated: 12 July 2018Source:

Campeonato Paulista

For the 2018 Campeonato Paulista, the 16 teams are divided in four groups of 4 teams (A, B, C, D). They will face all teams, except those that are in their own group, with the top two teams from each group qualifying for the quarterfinals. The two overall worst teams will be relegated.

Statistics

First stage

Knockout stages

Libertadores

Group stage

Knockout stages

Campeonato Brasileiro

Results

Copa do Brasil

Due to being qualified to the 2018 Copa Libertadores, Corinthians entered the competition on the round of 16.

Knockout stages

See also
List of Sport Club Corinthians Paulista seasons

Notes

References

Sport Club Corinthians Paulista seasons
Corinthians